Events in the year 1911 in Germany.

Incumbents

National level
 Kaiser – Wilhelm II
 Chancellor – Theobald von Bethmann Hollweg

State level

Kingdoms
 King of Bavaria – Otto of Bavaria
 King of Prussia – Kaiser Wilhelm II
 King of Saxony – Frederick Augustus III of Saxony
 King of Württemberg – William II of Württemberg

Grand Duchies
 Grand Duke of Baden – Frederick II
 Grand Duke of Hesse – Ernest Louis
 Grand Duke of Mecklenburg-Schwerin – Frederick Francis IV
 Grand Duke of Mecklenburg-Strelitz – Adolphus Frederick V
 Grand Duke of Oldenburg – Frederick Augustus II
 Grand Duke of Saxe-Weimar-Eisenach – William Ernest

Principalities
 Schaumburg-Lippe – George, Prince of Schaumburg-Lippe to 29 April, then Adolf II, Prince of Schaumburg-Lippe
 Schwarzburg-Rudolstadt – Günther Victor, Prince of Schwarzburg
 Schwarzburg-Sondershausen – Günther Victor, Prince of Schwarzburg
 Principality of Lippe – Leopold IV, Prince of Lippe
 Reuss Elder Line – Heinrich XXIV, Prince Reuss of Greiz (with Heinrich XIV, Prince Reuss Younger Line as regent)
 Reuss Younger Line – Heinrich XIV, Prince Reuss Younger Line
 Waldeck and Pyrmont – Friedrich, Prince of Waldeck and Pyrmont

Duchies
 Duke of Anhalt – Frederick II, Duke of Anhalt
 Duke of Brunswick – Duke John Albert of Mecklenburg (regent)
 Duke of Saxe-Altenburg – Ernst II, Duke of Saxe-Altenburg
 Duke of Saxe-Coburg and Gotha – Charles Edward, Duke of Saxe-Coburg and Gotha
 Duke of Saxe-Meiningen – Georg II, Duke of Saxe-Meiningen

Colonial Governors
 Cameroon (Kamerun) – Otto Gleim (3rd and final term) to October, then ... Hansen (acting governor)
 Kiaochow (Kiautschou) – Oskar von Truppel to 19 August, then Alfred Meyer-Waldeck
 German East Africa (Deutsch-Ostafrika) – Georg Albrecht Freiherr von Rechenberg
 German New Guinea (Deutsch-Neuguinea) – Albert Hahl (2nd term)
 German Samoa (Deutsch-Samoa) – Wilhelm Solf to 19 December, then Erich Schultz-Ewerth
 German South-West Africa (Deutsch-Südwestafrika) – Theodor Seitz
 Togoland – vacant until 31 March, then Edmund Brückner

Events
 1 July – The Agadir Crisis is triggered  when Germany's Ambassador to France, Wilhelm von Schoen, delivers a diplomatic note to France's Foreign Minister Justin de Selves, announcing that Germany has sent the gunboat SMS Panther and troops, to occupy Agadir, at that time a part of the protectorate of French Morocco.  T 
 4 November – The Treaty of Berlin brings the Agadir Crisis to a close. This treaty leads Morocco to be split between France (as a protectorate) and Spain (as the colony of Spanish Sahara), with Germany forfeiting all claims to Morocco. In return, France gives Germany a portion of the French Congo (as Kamerun) and Germany cedes some of German Kamerun to France (as Chad).

Births
 11 March – Haim Cohn German-born Israeli jurist and politician (died 2002)
 29 March – Freya von Moltke, participant in the anti-Nazi resistance group Kreisauer Kreis (died 2010) 
 6 April – Feodor Felix Konrad Lynen, German biochemist (died 1979)
 29 May – Leah Goldberg, German-born Israeli poet, author, playwright, translator, and researcher of Hebrew literature (died 1970)
 10 December – Anni Schaad, German jewelry maker (died 1988)
 14 December – Hans von Ohain, German physicist (died 1998)

Deaths
 15 February – Theodor Escherich, German-born Austrian pediatrician (b. 1857)
 18 February – Eduard Reuss, composer and music biographer (born 1851)
 25 February – Fritz von Uhde, painter (born 1848)
 17 March – Friedrich Haase, actor (born 1827)
 29 April – Georg, Prince of Schaumburg-Lippe, nobleman (born 1846)
 3 August – Reinhold Begas, sculptor (born 1831)
 1 October – Wilhelm Dilthey, psychologist, sociologist and philosopher (born 1833)
 15 October – James H. Schmitz, German-born American science fiction writer (d. 1981)

References

 
Years of the 20th century in Germany
Germany
Germany